The Bras Coupé Lake (French: Lac du Bras Coupé) is a freshwater body of the southern part of Eeyou Istchee James Bay (municipality), in the administrative region of Nord-du-Québec, in the province of Quebec, in Canada. The area of Bras Coupé Lake extends entirely into the townships of Lescure, in the territory of the Eeyou Istchee James Bay (municipality) regional government, south of Chapais, Quebec.

Forestry is the main economic activity of the sector.

The hydrographic slope of the "Lake du Bras Coupé" is accessible through the forest road (East-West direction) serving the southern part of the Lake and along the north side the boundary of the townships of Lescure and Druillettes.

The surface of Bras Coupé Lake is generally frozen from early November to mid-May, however, safe ice circulation is generally from mid-November to mid-April.

Geography 

In parallel on the South-East side, a peninsula stretching out on the South-West bounds the eastern arm of the Lac du Bras Coupé and the Lac de la Baie.

Finally, a fourth peninsula stretches north-east on the Rane Lake and a segment of the Opawica River that receives the waters of Lake des Vents.

Bras Coupé Lake has many bays, peninsulas and islands. The Opawica River crosses this set of water bodies, the main ones being "Du Bras Coupé Lake", Bay Lake, Rane Lake, Lac des Vents, the Irene Lake, Caopatina Lake and its tributary, the Surprise Lake.

Lake Du Bras Coupé gets its supply on the north-west side by the Denning Lake outlet and Lescure Lake outlet; to the northeast by the Lac Gantier outlet and the Lac Sébastien outlet; to the south, by the outlet of Lake Bernard.

The mouth of this "Lake Arm Cut" is located southwest of the lake. This mouth is located at:
 south-east of the mouth of the Opawica River (confluence with the Chibougamau River);
 south-east of the mouth of the Nottaway River;
 northwest of a bay of Gouin Reservoir;
 south-west of downtown Chibougamau;
 east of village center of Waswanipi

The main hydrographic slopes near Bras Coupé Lake are:
North side: Obatogamau River, Irene River;
East side: Lake Irene, Obatogamau Lakes, Opawica River, Lac des Vents, Lac La Dauversière;
South side: Lake of the Winds, Caopatina Lake, Surprise Lake;
West side: Doda Lake, Françoise Lake (Opawica River), Opawica River.

Toponymy 
This hydronym was formalized in 1935 by the Quebec Geography Committee. This name reflects the particular shape of this river arm intersected by four large peninsulas downstream of the Lac des Vents.

The toponym "Lac Du Bras Coupé" was formalized on December 5, 1968, by the Commission de toponymie du Québec, when it was created.

Notes and references

See also 

Eeyou Istchee James Bay
Lakes of Nord-du-Québec
Nottaway River drainage basin